Asimina parviflora, the smallflower pawpaw, is a shrub or small tree in the  custard apple family.

Distribution
It is native to the Southeastern United States, where it is found from Texas to Virginia. It is found most often in sandy areas, alluvial areas, and dry woods.

Description
Asimina parviflora has maroon, fleshy flowers in the spring. It produces an edible fruit, although the fruit is smaller than of its relative Asimina triloba, the Paw Paw tree. Its pollen is shed as permanent tetrads.

Small-flower pawpaws are found further south than common pawpaws, and form shrubs rather than trees, with most plants ranging in height from one to three feet, with only a few getting taller. The flowers are usually smaller than two centimeters in size. The flowers begin as brown buds, then swell to green immature flowers, and turn burgundy or brown when fully mature.

The leaves are usually a dark green, and smooth in texture.

References

External links

USDA Plants Profile for Asimina parviflora (smallflower pawpaw)

parviflora
Edible fruits
Trees of the Southeastern United States
Flora of Texas